Ansonia High School may refer to:

 Ansonia High School (Connecticut), Ansonia, Connecticut
 Ansonia High School (Ohio), Ansonia, Ohio